Andrew Knight is the name of:

* Andrew Knight (journalist) (born 1939), English journalist, editor, and director of News Corporation
 Andrew Knight (politician) (1813–1904), politician in colonial Victoria, Australia
 Andrew Knight (writer) (born 1953), Australian TV writer and producer